Hangup, also called  Hang Up and later released under the name Super Dude, is a 1974 film directed by Henry Hathaway. It stars William Elliott and Marki Bey. This was the last film directed by Hathaway.

The film falls in the blaxploitation subgenre of "vigilante group cleans up ghetto streets". The film follows a black policeman seeking revenge on the man who got his girlfriend addicted to heroin. The film was distributed by American International Pictures, one of the many films it targeted to the new youth market. Josiah Howard states that the marketing "almost makes it look like a spoof of the genre."  Howard described the film as "low budget and flashy, but fast-moving and consistently entertaining." Leonard Maltin wrote "Hathaway has done many fine films, but this, his last, isn't one."

Plot

Cast
 William Elliott as Ken
 Cliff Potts as Lou
 Marki Bey as Julie
 Jerry Ayres as Jerry
 Wally Taylor as Sergeant Becker
 Barbara Baldavin as Beverly
 Morris Buchanan as Dave
 Rafael Campos as "Longnose"
 Bob Delegall as Jennings
 Louie Elias as Detective
 Duffy Hambleton as Detective
 Mark Russell as Detective
 Lynn Hamilton as Mrs. Ramsey
 Herbert Jefferson, Jr. as Ben
 Michael Lerner as Richards
 Timothy Blake as Gwen

See also
 List of American films of 1974

References

External links
 

1974 films
Films directed by Henry Hathaway
Blaxploitation films
Warner Bros. films
1970s English-language films
American exploitation films
1970s American films